Yevgeni Vasilyevich Trefilov (born 4 September 1955) is the handball head coach of the Russian women's national team. He has led the Russian team to win the IHF World Women's Handball Championship four times, in 2001, 2005, 2007 and 2009. He rejoined the national team on 16 September 2013. Under his supervision, Russia won the 2016 Summer Olympics.

Trefilov is known for his dictatorial style of coaching and physical abuse of female athletes. Despite this, he was highly regarded in the former Soviet Union and is now in Russia. Trefilov considers himself a Soviet patriot and has espoused xenophobic views.

References

External links
Биография на сайте «Лады»

1955 births
Living people
Russian handball coaches
People from Ust-Labinsky District
Soviet male handball players
Honoured Coaches of Russia
Handball coaches of international teams
Sportspeople from Krasnodar Krai